Simplemente María (English title: Simply María) is a Mexican telenovela produced by Valentín Pimstein for Televisa in 1989.

Victoria Ruffo, Manuel Saval and Jaime Garza starred as protagonists, while Gabriela Goldsmith starred as main antagonist.

Cast 
  
 Victoria Ruffo as María López de Carreño
 Manuel Saval as Juan Carlos del Villar Montenegro; (Dies after an accident)
 Jaime Garza as Víctor Carreño
 Silvia Derbez as Matilde Carreño
 Gabriela Goldsmith as Lorena del Villar Montenegro de Rivera; Main Villain (Dies in a car explosion)
 Florencia Ferret as Claudia
 Sergio Acosta as Detective Augustín Zepeta
 María Almela as Ana López de Sotomayor
 Miguel Derbez as José Ignacio López (niño)
 Jorge Poza as José Ignacio López (preteen)
 Toño Mauri as José Ignacio López
 Amairani as Laura Rivera del Villar de Lopez; (Dies after giving birth)
 Alejandro Aragón as Diego López
 Angélica Aragón as Gloria
 Raul Padilla "Choforo" as Rene#1
 Cesar Arias as Rene#2
 Roberto Ballesteros as Arturo D'Angelle; Villain (Killed by Lorena)
 Juan Carlos Barreto as Benito
 Vanessa Bauche as Julia Carreño (preteen)
 Porfirio Baz as Germán Carreño
 Marcelo Buquet as Dr. Fernando Torres
 Rafael Inclán as Don Chema
 Andrea Legarreta as Ivonne Ayala; Villain (Ends up in jail)
 Frances Ondiviela as Natalia Preciado; Villain (Commits Suicide)
 David Ostrosky as Rodrigo de Peñalvert, Count de Arenzo
 Roberto Palazuelos as Pedro Cuevas; Villain (Ends up in jail)
 Angélica Rivera as Isabella de Peñalvert de López
 Claudio Baez as Gustavo del Villar
 Cecilia Camacho as Estela López De Reyes
 Constantino Costas as Clemente Reyes
 Rosa Carmina as Camelia Ramos
 Mauricio Ferrari as Dr. Luis Valadez
 Servando Manzetti as Dr. Alberto Rivera
 Lola Merino as Fernanda Amolinar de Del Villar; (Dies of a heart attack)
 Karen Sentíes as Silvia Rebollar de Rivera
 Adriana Parra as Rita Fernández de López
 Mercedes Pascual as Constanza de Peñalvert
 Raquel Parot as Mother Carmela
 Roberto Vander as Lic. Rafael Hidalgo
 Rafael del Villar as Jacinto López
 Claudia Ortega as Nazaria Fernández
 Juan Bernardo Gasca as Marcos Carreño (preteen)
 Javier Herranz as Marcos Carreño; (Dies of leukemia)
 Rocío Brambila as Julia Carreño
 Silvia Campos as Violeta Alvear
 Maya Mishalska as Ofelia
 Nicky Mondellini as Isabel, nurse in Valadez's clinic
 María Morett as Margarita López
 Tina Romero as Dr. Gabriela del Conde
 Gustavo Cosain as Don Nacho López (Dies in Dr. Valades Hospital after brain surgery due to a visit from Lorena who abused him in front of Maria)
 Sergio Basañez as Jeane Claude Carre
 Carlos Bonavides as Dr. Rojas
 Eduardo Borja as Station boss
 Alberto González as Dr. Tomás
 Patricia Castro as Palmira #1
 Myrrha Saavedra as Palmira #2
 Sandra Félix as Mrs. Urquiaga
 Estela Furlong as Mrs. González
 Rodrigo Ramón as Germán Carreño (preteen)
 Evangelina Sosa as Perla "Perlita" Carreño (preteen)
 Lucy Reina as Perla "Perlita" Carreño
 Jose Maria Fernandez as Mauricio Egeyros
 Angelina Peláez as La Prieta
 Beatriz Olea as Yolanda López
 Ricardo Vera as Teniente Ornelas
 Raul Nava as Butler of Count de Arenzo
 Celia Suarez as Dr. chief in Valadez's clinic
 Ana Iris Bosch as Dr. in Valadez's clinic
 Pilar Souza as Lorena's nurse
 Irma Torres as Crisanta Fernandez
 Jacqueline Voltaire as Nancy Williams
 Tony Rodríguez as Dr. Gonzalo Arviso Arismendi
 Víctor Carpinteiro as Deaf-mute servant Rosendo and Camellia
 Antonio Rangel as Enrique Nunez
 Charly Valentino as Teniente Acuña
 Arath de la Torre as Michell
 Juan Ignacio Aranda as Pablo Alvear
 Silvia Suarez as Amelia Alvear
 Ligia Escalante as Nadya
 Eva Calvo as Doña Tulia, director el pueblo escuela

 Alejandro Beccerril

Awards

References

External links 

1989 telenovelas
Mexican telenovelas
1989 Mexican television series debuts
1990 Mexican television series endings
Spanish-language telenovelas
Television shows set in Mexico City
Television shows set in Paris
Television shows set in Miami
Television shows set in California
Televisa telenovelas